Eduard Friedrich Ferdinand Castle [kastle] (November 7, 1875 in Vienna – June 8, 1959 in Vienna) was an Austrian-German Germanist and literary historian (Literatur- & Theaterwissenschaftler).

He participated in the establishment of the Wiener Volkskonservatorium.

He taught as a professor at Vienna University (1945-). He retired in 1949.

Literary works 
 Deutsch-österreichische Literaturgeschichte, 1937
 Der große Unbekannte: Das Leben von Charles Sealsfield, 1952

References
 http://www.adulteducation.at/de/historiografie/personen/217/

External links
 

Linguists from Germany
Linguists from Austria
Germanists
German literary critics
Austrian literary historians
German literary historians
1875 births
1959 deaths
German male non-fiction writers